Gösta Leandersson (22 April 1918 – 1995) was a Swedish marathon runner. He won the Košice Peace Marathon in 1948 and 1950 and Boston Marathon in 1949. At the European championships he finished fifth in 1946, and fourth in 1950.

References

1918 births
1995 deaths
Swedish male long-distance runners
Swedish male marathon runners
Boston Marathon male winners